Helter Stupid is a song by Negativland, released on their 1989 album Helter Stupid. It is an audio collage of the media controversy that resulted when, as a prank, Negativland claimed that their song "Christianity Is Stupid" had spurred David Brom to kill his family.

In addition to audio of KPIX-TV's coverage of the Brom hoax, the piece also includes samples from Estus Pirkle, Charles Manson, and the Beatles song "Helter Skelter".

Reception
Robert Christgau has described "Helter Stupid" as "funny, slightly scary, (and) dumbfoundingly surreal", rating it A−.

References

Negativland songs
1989 songs